Eat Shit You Fucking Redneck is a live album by Pigface.

Track list

Personnel
Martin Atkins - drums, mixing
Charles Levi - bass
Gus Ferguson - cello, percussion
Genesis P-Orridge - synthesizers, programming
BobDog Catlin - guitar, sitar
Curse Mackey - vocals, programming
Jared Louche - vocals
Jennie Bellestar - vocals
Meg Lee Chin - vocals
F.M. Einheit - vocals
Gry Bagøien - vocals
Marc Heal - vocals
Slymenstra Hymen - vocals
Zaki Youssef - vocals
Joe Trump - drums
Martin King - drums

External links
[ Track listing] from Allmusic

1998 live albums
Pigface albums